The following are the records of Papua New Guinea in Olympic weightlifting. Records are maintained in each weight class for the snatch lift, clean and jerk lift, and the total for both lifts by the Papua New Guinea Weightlifting Federation.

Current records

Men

Women

Historical records

Men (1998–2018)

Women (1998–2018)

References

External links

weightlifting
Papua New Guinea
Papua
Olympic Weightlifting